The buff-bellied pipit or American pipit (Anthus rubescens) is a small songbird found on both sides of the northern Pacific. It was first described by Marmaduke Tunstall in his 1771 Ornithologia Britannica. It was formerly classified as a form of the water pipit. It is known as "American pipit" in North America and "buff-bellied pipit" in Eurasia.

Description
Like most other pipits, the buff-bellied pipit is an undistinguished-looking species which usually can be seen to run around on the ground. The rubescens subspecies (or American pipit) has lightly streaked grey-brown upperparts and is diffusely streaked below on the buff breast and flanks. The belly is whitish, the bill and legs are dark. The japonicus subspecies (or Japanese pipit) is darker above and has bolder black streaking on its whiter underparts; its legs have a reddish hue. The call is a squeaky sip.

Measurements:

 Length: 16 cm 
 Weight: 22 g 
 Wingspan: 24 cm

Taxonomy
The scientific name is from Latin. Anthus is the name for a small bird of grasslands, and the specific rubescens means "reddish", from
ruber,  "ruddy".

Four subspecies are currently recognized belonging to two main groups. Morphological and DNA sequence differences between the are rather pronounced and they might be considered distinct species pending further research:
 A. r. rubescens - (Tunstall, 1771),  – breeds in northern Canada east to Greenland and northeast United States, wintering in Central America
A. r. pacificus - (Todd, 1935) Breeds in Pacific Cordillera from Alaska to Oregon, wintering in western Mexico. Birds breeding in south Alaska have sometimes been recognized as a distinct subspecies A. r. geophilus. 
A. r. alticola - (Todd, 1935) Breeds in the Rocky Mountains from southern British Columbia to California, wintering in Mexico
 A. r. japonicus - Temminck & Schlegel, 1847,  or Siberian pipit – breeds in most of the eastern Palearctic (including Japan)

This species is closely related to European rock pipit (A. petrosus) and water pipit (A. spinoletta), all three forms having previously been considered conspecific. They can be differentiated by their vocalizations and some visual cues, but rock and buff-bellied pipit are not found sympatrically except as vagrant individuals, and the ranges of buff-bellied and water pipits overlap only in a small area in Central Asia.

Behavior
Both subspecies of the buff-bellied pipit are migratory. The buff-bellied pipit winters on the Pacific coast of North America, and on the Atlantic coast from the southern North America to Central America. At least regarding the buff-bellied pipit, its wintering range seems to have expanded northwards in the 20th century and the birds seem to spend less time in winter quarters: in northern Ohio, for example, the species was recorded as "not common" during migration in May and September/October in the 1900s (decade), but today it is considered a "widespread migrant" in that region, found between March and May and from late September to November, with many birds actually wintering this far north. Asian birds winter mainly from Pakistan east to and Southeast Asia, with occasional birds found as far north as Yunnan and some in Japan apparently being all-year residents or migrating but a little. The American and Asian subspecies are rare vagrants to Western and Eastern Europe, respectively.

Like its relatives, this species is insectivorous. The breeding habitat of buff-bellied pipit is tundra, but outside the breeding season it is found in open lightly vegetated areas, similar to those favoured by the water pipit (A. spinoletta).

Reproduction: from pairing to fledging

The first thing buff-bellied pipits do when they arrive on the breeding site, during snowmelt, is pairing. Indeed, males will start to fight one on one to win over the female and pair with it during the entire breeding season. They also fight for the snow-free sites that would be better for nesting. The moment is also very important because the melting snow implies an increase in arthropods abundance, which constitute the main food source for these birds. After the fight and the pairing, nesting is the next step. Nests are most often found on the ground in dry or wet meadows, always with a helpful protection, but they are never placed in shrubs or trees. The composition of the ideal nest depends on whatever is around the nesting area, but it is usually made of sedge, remains or new fine grass, and sometimes some horse hairs. The final issue buff-bellied pipits have to deal with is nest success. The nest is indeed the target for numerous predators such as ants or hawks. If this step is successful, an egg can be produced. The female will not lay an egg if the conditions, such as temperature and nesting site, are not optimal. If the first attempt fails, her time to lay an egg is reduced. In general, buff-bellied pipits continuously lay eggs over a period of 4 to 5 days after snow-melt (in April–May) until mid-July. After this period, the male testes decrease in size and the female refuses any copulation. The clutch size is usually 5 eggs but it can vary according to snowfalls, the parents’ reproductive ability and predation. Eggs are incubated for 13–14 days. During this time, the female does not leave the nest, but is still very reactive to any movement around her. She communicates by singing to the male that brings her food and defends their territory. Four or five days after hatching, the young is skinny, blue-gray in color, and only has its secondary feathers. For a week, the female will brood the clutch, but both parents will feed them. After these 7 days, the birds are ready for fledging but they will still be fed by their parents for 14 days after their departure. Finally, immature birds will form little flocks with other immature birds and wander off.

Status
It is a widespread and common species and not considered threatened by the IUCN.

References

External links

 American pipit – Anthus rubescens – USGS Patuxent Bird Identification InfoCenter
 American pipit Species Account – Cornell Lab of Ornithology
 
 
 

buff-bellied pipit
Birds of North Asia
Birds of North America
buff-bellied pipit
buff-bellied pipit